York Mills GO Bus Terminal is located at 4023 Yonge Street, near the northeast corner of York Mills Road, in the North York area of Toronto, Ontario, Canada. The terminal mainly supports GO Transit's bus services east and west across the Highway 401 corridor and is adjacent to York Mills station on the Yonge-University-Spadina line of the Toronto Subway.

Location 

The bus station is on the ground floor of York Mills Centre, Building 4, constructed by York-Trillium Development Group Limited  in 1992. This space is part of the upper level of York Mills subway station and leased from the Toronto Transit Commission/City of Toronto, but is separate and distinct from the TTC facility that it is connected to. There is a height restriction that prevented use of GO Transit's original fleet of double-decker buses on routes that serve York Mills Terminal until 'Super-Lo' models became available.

History 

The area is part of historic Hoggs Hollow where the first settler arrived in 1794. Originally it was called York Mills Village due to the development of the area around three mills. At the beginning of the 20th century, the valley began to develop a more residential nature. Surrounded by tall trees, steep hills and parkland, Hoggs Hollow has become one of Toronto's prime residential areas, with a little more commercial development in recent years.

GO Transit bus routes

19B Mississauga / North York Service
27B Milton Hwy 401 Service
32 Brampton Hwy. 407 Service
33 Guelph Hwy. 410 Service
36 Brampton via Hwy. 427 Express
92 Oshawa/Yorkdale Service

See also
York Mills (TTC)
GO Transit

References

External links

York Mills Centre

GO Transit bus terminals
Transport infrastructure completed in 1992
1992 establishments in Ontario
North York